The base62 encoding scheme uses 62 characters. The characters consist of the capital letters A-Z, the lower case letters a-z and the numbers 0–9. It is a binary-to-text encoding schemes that represent binary data in an ASCII string format.

 123456789ABCDEFGHJKLMNPQRSTUVWXYZabcdefghijkmnopqrstuvwxyz
 = 58 characters = base58
 
 0123456789ABCDEFGHIJKLMNOPQRSTUVWXYZabcdefghijklmnopqrstuvwxyz
 = 62 characters = base62
 
 0123456789ABCDEFGHIJKLMNOPQRSTUVWXYZabcdefghijklmnopqrstuvwxyz+/
 = 64 characters = base64

In some fonts the 0 (zero), I (capital i), O (capital o) and l (lower case L) characters look the same, and thus are not used in the base58 encoding scheme.

Base62 table
The Base62 index table:

See also 
 List of numeral systems

References 

Internet Standards
Binary-to-text encoding formats
Data serialization formats